Tolbazy (Talbaźı) is a rural locality (a village) in Karacha-Yelginsky Selsoviet, Kushnarenkovsky District, Bashkortostan, Russia. The population was 362 as of 2010. There are 4 streets.

Geography 
Tolbazy is located 28 km northwest of Kushnarenkovo (the district's administrative centre) by road. Staraya Murtaza is the nearest rural locality.

References 

Rural localities in Kushnarenkovsky District